Burgruine Sturmberg is a castle in Naas, Styria, Austria.

See also
List of castles in Austria

References
This article was initially translated from the German Wikipedia.

External links 
 Ruine Sturmberg

Castles in Styria